Paul Gundani (1967 – 3 November 2015) was a Zimbabwean professional football player. He made three appearances for the Zimbabwe national football team.

References

External links

1967 births
2015 deaths
Zimbabwean footballers
Zimbabwe international footballers
Association football defenders